Osborne is a dispersed rural community and unincorporated place in the municipality of St. Clair, Lambton County in Southwestern Ontario, Canada.

References

Communities in Lambton County